Phanaʼ (also called Bana or Pana) is a Loloish language of Laos and China. Phanaʼ is spoken by 500 people in Laos. In China, it is spoken in Mengla County, Yunnan Province (Bradley 2007). It is closely related to Sila, which is spoken by 2,000 people in Laos and Vietnam (Bradley 1997).

Phanaʼ is spoken in three villages in Laos (Ethnologue).
Bopiet, Luang Namtha District, Luang Prabang Province
Namtoung, Luang Namtha District, Luang Prabang Province
one village in Houaixay District, Bokeo Province

Bradley (2007) reports a population of about 1,000 for Phanaʼ.

Lefèvre-Pontalis (1892) reports the presence of Phanaʼ in Poufang, Lai Chau province, Vietnam, and provides a word list for Phanaʼ as well.

Numerals
Phanaʼ (Bana) numerals are as follows.

References

External links

Southern Loloish languages
Languages of Laos
Languages of China